Plutonia may refer to:
 Plutonia (gastropod), a genus of air-breathing land snails
Vladimir Obruchev's Plutonia (Плутония) (1915)
 Psilocybe plutonia, a species of mushroom
 The Plutonia Experiment, a WAD made for Final Doom
 Plutonium(IV) oxide

cs:Plutonie